Thomas Tyrwhitt (27 March 173015 August 1786) was an English classical scholar and critic.

Life
He was born in London, where he also died. He was educated at Eton College and Queen's College, Oxford. He was elected a fellow of Merton College, Oxford in 1755. In 1756 he was appointed under-secretary at war, in 1762 clerk of the House of Commons. In 1768 he resigned his post, and spent the remainder of his life in learned retirement. In February 1771 he was elected a Fellow of the Royal Society. In 1784 he was elected a trustee of the British Museum, to which he bequeathed a portion of his valuable library.

Works
His principal classical works are:
Fragmenta Plutarchi II. inedita (1773), from a Harleian manuscript
Dissertatio de Babrio (1776), containing some fables of Aesop, hitherto unedited, from a Bodleian manuscript
the pseudo-Orphic De lapidibus (1781), which he assigned to the age of Constantius
Conjecturae in Strabonem (1783)
Isaeus De Meneclis hereditate (1785)
Aristotle's Poetica, his most important work, published after his death under the superintendence of Thomas Burgess, bishop of Salisbury, in 1794.

Special mention is due of his editions of Chaucer's Canterbury Tales (1775–1778); and of Poems, supposed to have been written at Bristol by "Thomas Rowley" and others in the 15th century (1777–1778), with an appendix to prove that the poems were all the work of Thomas Chatterton. Tyrwhitt's bibliophile friend Thomas Crofts is credited with introducing Tyrwhitt in 1776 to George Catcott, the owner of the "manuscripts" of the poems. Initially Tyrwhitt was convinced that they were authentic, and pressed for publication in 1777. It was only when the third edition was published that Tyrwhitt changed his mind and pronounced the poems forgeries.

In 1782 he published a Vindication of the Appendix in reply to the arguments that they were authentic. While clerk of the House of Commons he edited Proceedings and Debates of the House of Commons, 1620–1621 from the original manuscript in the library of Queen's College, Oxford, and Henry Elsynge's The Manner of Holding Parliaments in England (1768).

References

Sources

1730 births
1786 deaths
Alumni of The Queen's College, Oxford
English classical scholars
Fellows of Merton College, Oxford
People educated at Eton College
Fellows of the Royal Society
Chaucer scholars
Clerks of the House of Commons